The Abbot of Kilwinning (later Commendator of Kilwinning) was the head of the Tironensian monastic community and lands of Kilwinning Abbey, Cunningham (now in North Ayrshire), founded between 1162 and 1167. The patron is not known for certain, but it is likely to have been Richard de Morville, Lord of Cunningham. The following are a list of abbots and commendators.

List of abbots
 Rainer, 1186x1189
 Nigel (?Niall), 1201-1210
 John, 1221x1230
 Bernard, 1296
 Roger, 1296x1305
 Adam, 1312-1327
 William de Deyn, 1327 x 1329-1344
 John de Dalgarno, 1344-1346
 Robert, 1360-1367
 John, 1384
 Bryce MacMakyn, 1407
 Adam, 1407 - 1439
 William Boyd, 1443-1474
 William Bunche, 1474 -1513
 John Forman, 1512 -1514

List of commendators
 James Beaton, 1513-1524
 John Cantlie, 1521
 John Hamilton, 1524
 George Betoun, 1526-1527
 Alexander Hamilton, 1527-1547
 Henry Sinclair, 1541-1550
 Gavin Hamilton, 1550-1571
 Alexander Cunningham, 1571-1585
 James Cunningham, 1585
 William Melville, 1591-1592

See also
 Kilwinning Abbey

Notes

Bibliography
Cowan, Ian B. & Easson, David E., Medieval Religious Houses: Scotland With an Appendix on the Houses in the Isle of Man, Second Edition, (London, 1976), p. 69
Watt, D.E.R. & Shead, N.F. (eds.), The Heads of Religious Houses in Scotland from the 12th to the 16th Centuries, The Scottish Records Society, New Series, Volume 24, (Edinburgh, 2001), pp. 127–30

Scottish abbots
Tironensians
Kilwinning